Bret Hall is an American soccer coach and former professional player who played in the NASL, Major Indoor Soccer League and National Professional Soccer League. He has coached at the collegiate, professional and national team levels.

Player
Hall played soccer for Wheaton College, graduating in 1979.  The Portland Timbers of the North American Soccer League drafted Hall in the second round of the 1979 NASL Draft.  He never played for the Timbers.  Instead, he played for the Chicago Sting from 1980 to 1983. 
In 1981 he became a NASL league champion winning the Soccer Bowl with the Sting, defeating the New York Cosmos in Toronto and bringing the title back to Chicago. In the fall of 1983, he moved to the Cleveland Force of the Major Indoor Soccer League.  In 1988, he moved to the Chicago Power of the American Indoor Soccer Association where he was a 1988 First Team All Star and the 1990 Defender of the Year and a First Team All Star.

Coach
In August 1994, Hall became the Director of Coaching for the Chicago Power.  In 1998, he was hired by the Chicago Stingers of the USISL.  He took the team to the league championship.  In 1999, the team was renamed the Sockers and he took them to two more titles before the team folded following the 2000 season.  In 2000, he was hired to coach the Indiana Blast, but stepped down a few weeks later without coaching a game.  In 2001, he became the head coach of the Chicago Fire Reserves.  In those five seasons, he had a 67-21-2 record.  Hall currently coaches at Baylor University.

He was inducted into the USL Hall of Fame in 2004.

References

External links
 NASL/MISL career stats
 Career overview

1956 births
Living people
American soccer players
American soccer coaches
American Indoor Soccer Association players
Chicago Power players
Chicago Sting (NASL) players
Chicago Sting (MISL) players
Cleveland Force (original MISL) players
Major Indoor Soccer League (1978–1992) players
National Professional Soccer League (1984–2001) players
North American Soccer League (1968–1984) players
North American Soccer League (1968–1984) indoor players
Phoenix Pride players
Soccer players from New York (state)
Sportspeople from Buffalo, New York
USISL coaches
Chicago Sockers players
Wheaton College (Illinois) alumni
Association football defenders